Seguel is a Spanish surname usually found in Chile and Argentina. Notable people with the surname include:

Daniela Seguel (born 1992), Chilean tennis player
Fernando Díaz Seguel (born 1961), Chilean football manager and a former goalkeeper

Spanish-language surnames